Prosopocera belzebuth is a species of beetle in the family Cerambycidae. It was described by James Thomson in 1857. It is known from Nigeria, the Ivory Coast, Togo, Senegal, the Central African Republic, and the Democratic Republic of the Congo.

Subspecies
 Prosopocera belzebuth belzebuth Thomson, 1857
 Prosopocera belzebuth hintzi Aurivillius, 1922
 Prosopocera belzebuth infravalida Breuning, 1970

References

Prosopocerini
Beetles described in 1857